Jagdish Balar, better known as Jagdish Patel is a BJP politician from Surat, Gujarat. He was the 36th Mayor of Surat / Surat Municipal Corporation. He is an Ayurvedic practitioner and a trustee of Kiran Hospital, run by Surat builders and diamond traders.

He is supporting "Youth Against Injustice Foundation" and its mission "Youth Against Rape".

See also
 Surat Municipal Corporation
 Bharatiya Janata Party
 Surat

References

External links 
 

Living people
Mayors of Surat
Politicians from Surat
1962 births
Bharatiya Janata Party politicians from Gujarat